Gary Williamson may refer to:

Gary Williamson (footballer) (1941–2009), Australian rules footballer for Richmond and South Melbourne
Gary Williamson (ice hockey) (born 1950), Canadian former World Hockey Association forward
Gary Williamson, Canadian politician elected in the Wellington County municipal elections, 2010 
Gary Williamson, contestant who appeared as Tony Christie  on a 2000 episode of Stars in Their Eyes
Gary Williamson, drummer with the Australian rock band The Zorros
Gary Williamson, production designer and British Independent Film Awards 2009 nominee